Kosovar–South Sudanese relations are foreign relations between South Sudan and Kosovo.

History 
In July 2011, Kosovo's First deputy prime minister, Behgjet Pacolli, was invited to attend South Sudan's independence ceremony.

In September 2012, South Sudan's vice-president, Riek Machar Teny, invited Kosovo's prime minister, Hashim Thaçi, to South Sudan to discuss building bilateral relations between the two countries. During an October 2012 meeting with Pacolli, South Sudan's president Salva Kiir Mayardit stated his country's desire to maintain friendly relations with Kosovo. He reiterated the position that South Sudan supports the right of the citizens of Kosovo to build and consolidate their state. In September 2013 the Foreign Minister of South Sudan, Barnaba Marial Benjamin, confirmed that the recognition of Kosovo was a matter of time.

In April 2014, Benjamin said that positive news in regards to improving relations with Kosovo should be expected. In September 2014, Benjamin said that South Sudan was considering with seriousness the recognition of the independence and would follow all the procedures in order to do so.

Notes

See also 

 Foreign relations of South Sudan
 Foreign relations of Kosovo

References 

South Sudan
Bilateral relations of South Sudan